Sissa Trecasali  (Sèsa Tricasè in Parmigiano dialect) is a comune (municipality) in the Province of Parma in the Italian region Emilia-Romagna.

It was formed January 1, 2014 with the merger of municipalities Sissa and Trecasali.

References

Cities and towns in Emilia-Romagna